Ñuñu Qullu (Aymara ñuñu breast, qullu mountain, "breast mountain", also spelled Nunu Kkollu) is a  mountain in the Andes of Bolivia. It is situated in the Oruro Department, Pantaleón Dalence Province, Huanuni Municipality. Ñuñu Qullu lies north-west of the mountain  Ch'iyara Ch'ankha and near the mountain Janq'u Qalani, south-west of it.

The river Lamama Mayu (Quechua for "stepmother river") originates at the feet of the mountains Ñuñu Qullu and Janq'u Qalani. It flows to the south-west where it meets Huanuni River.

References 

Mountains of Oruro Department